Oakwood Cemetery is a  cemetery in Waco, Texas, in which three governors of Texas are buried.

History
Founded in 1878, to relieve crowded conditions at Waco's main, First Street Cemetery, the cemetery was built on the site of an abandoned horse racing track.

Many interred remains from other early local graveyards were moved here because of the better maintenance of these grounds. Since 1898, the Oakwood Cemetery Association, a private group, has operated this tract, although the land remains the property of the city. The board of directors of the association consists of women only, as provided in the original by-laws.

The cemetery is characterised by tree-lined streets, large monuments and angels.

Notable burials
 William Cowper Brann (1855–1898), Crusading journalist, and playwright. Editor of the Iconoclast.
 Rufus Columbus Burleson (1823–1901), President of Baylor University twice, 1851–1861 and 1886–1897.
 Richard Coke (1829–1897), Twice elected Governor of Texas, United States Senator. Coke is buried near his “friend through eternity”, David Richard Wallace. Their life-size statues face each other. Interred at Lot 66, block 1.
 Hallie Earle (1880–1963), First licensed female physician in Waco, only female graduate of 1907 Baylor University Medical School in Dallas.
 Frank Shelby Groner (1877–1943), President of College of Marshall.
 Thomas Harrison (1823–1891), Confederate States Army general.
 Neil McLennan (ca. 1777–1867), Namesake of McLennan County, Texas pioneer of Scottish birth.
 Patrick Morris Neff (1871–1952), Governor of Texas and President of Baylor University. Interred at Lot 149, section F.
 Felix Huston Robertson (1839–1928), Confederate brigadier general.
 Jerome B. Robertson (1815–1890), Confederate colonel and temporary brigadier general.
 Lawrence Sullivan Ross (1838–1898), Namesake of Sul Ross State University, United States Senator, Governor of Texas, President of Texas A&M University. Texas Ranger who recaptured  Cynthia Ann Parker.  Confederate Brigadier General. Interred at Lot 5, block 1.
Edgar E. Witt (1876–1965), Lieutenant Governor of Texas 1931-1935, Chair American-Mexican Claims Commission, Chief Commissioner Indian Claims Commission.
James E. Yantis (1856–1918), Justice of the Texas Supreme Court.

References

External links
 

Cemeteries in Texas
Geography of Waco, Texas
Protected areas of McLennan County, Texas
1878 establishments in Texas
Tourist attractions in Waco, Texas